"Walk on Water" is a song by American rapper Eminem featuring vocals by American singer Beyoncé. It was released on November 10, 2017 as the lead single from Eminem's ninth studio album Revival. The song was written by the artists alongside, Skylar Grey, who produced it with Rick Rubin. It has reached the top 10 in Australia, Ireland, Scotland, Sweden, Switzerland, and United Kingdom, as well as the top 20 in Austria, France, Germany, Hungary, Lebanon, New Zealand, Norway, and the United States. The music video received a nomination for Best Visual Effects at the 2018 MTV Video Music Awards.

Production

The song started as a hook written by Skylar Grey, who also co-wrote Eminem's 2010 hit single "Love the Way You Lie". Eminem came across the hook when he was working with Rick Rubin and became enamored of the lyrics. Previously Eminem and Rubin had been discussing the phenomenon of mumble rap, specifically Eminem's frustration with its mainstream popularity, and the hook served as a vehicle for him to vent them. Rubin subsequently played the song for Jay-Z, who was then able to get his wife, Beyoncé, to sing the chorus. Upon the release of the single, Grey tweeted, "This is the song I've been trying to write since age 6. Every time I wrote a song I hoped it would be this good. I am truly proud of everything I've created, but this is the one."

Critical reception
"Walk on Water" received negative reviews from general public and critics. Jayson Greene of Pitchfork described the song as a "joyless trudge of a power ballad that pairs a softly crooned hook with fuming, escalating verses of rage-spittle." Vultures reviewer Frank Guan said that it "isn't a great song".

Release and promotion
On November 8, 2017, Eminem tweeted a picture of a doctor's prescription note with the words "'Walk on Water', take as needed" written on it. This has caused speculation that the first single will be titled "Walk on Water". The fake doctor's note was labeled with the logo for Revival. On November 9, Paul Rosenberg shared a video on Instagram that showcased Trevor the spokesperson for the Revival campaign stating that "you will be able to Walk on Water with Revival at noon EST", confirming the song. An audio and a lyric video was uploaded to Eminem's YouTube channel. As of December 25, 2017, the video has over 50 million views and 1 million likes.

Music video
On December 23, 2017, the music video for the song was released exclusively on Apple Music and Eminem's official Vevo channel. It was directed by American director Richard "Rich" Lee, who previously directed Eminem's videos for "Not Afraid", "Rap God", "The Monster" and "Phenomenal". Beyoncé does not appear in the video. As of April 8, 2022, the video has over 75 million views and 1.2 million likes. The video starts with a beam of light that turns out to be a special on a microphone. Eminem is sitting next to it lamenting when he finally decides to come up to the mic. The lights slowly come up to reveal an auditorium during the second chorus. Many disciples and clones of Eminem are seen typing gibberish into a typewriter. There is then a montage of set pieces being placed on stage to resemble concerts he has performed. During the third chorus, there is a time lapse of fans in the auditorium seats. The fans leave during the third verse when Eminem glitches between different personas and it starts to snow. Eminem is seen in a barren wasteland of ice. He finds a huge statue covered, then, with deliberation, pulls it off. Back to the typewriter room, Eminem starts to write the lyrics to "Stan" and then pulls it out of the typewriter and delivers the closing line, "Bitch, I wrote 'Stan'".

The video received a nomination at the 2018 MTV Video Music Awards for Best Visual Effects.

Live performances
The song was first performed by Eminem at the 2017 MTV Europe Music Awards on November 12 with co-producer and writer Skylar Grey on vocals. Both also performed the song on Saturday Night Live on November 18, along with his previous songs "Stan" and "Love the Way You Lie".

Commercial performance
In the United States, "Walk on Water" debuted and peaked at number 14 on the Billboard Hot 100, becoming the 57th entry for both artists on the chart. As a result, they tied with Madonna and The Rolling Stones for the 19th highest number of overall songs to enter the chart. It also arrived at number 2 on the Digital Songs chart with 64,000 downloads and the Streaming Songs chart at number 15 with 18.3 million streams.  It failed to have the longevity of his past hits, spending only 5 weeks on the Hot 100.

The song opened the UK Singles Chart at number seven, becoming Eminem's 28th entry to reach the nation's top 10 and Beyoncé's 35th. Upon entering at number 10 on the ARIA Singles Chart, it became the rapper's thirteenth song as a lead artist to reach the top 10 in Australia and first since "The Monster" in 2013, and Beyoncé's 22nd, the first since 2011's Run the World (Girls)". Elsewhere, the song debuted at number eight on the Irish Singles Chart, number nine in Sweden, and number four in Scotland.
By the end of 2018, the song has been eligible for a gold certification in the United States.

Awards and nominations

Credits and personnel
Credits adapted from Revival album liner notes.Recording and managementRecorded at Effigy Studios (Detroit) and Shangri La Studio (Malibu)
Piano recorded at Grizzly Manor Studios (Park City, Utah)
Mixed at Larrabee Sound Studios (North Hollywood)
Mastered at Brian Gardner Mastering
Published by Songs of Universal, Inc./Shroom Shady Music (BMI), Hotel Bravo Music/Universal Music-Z Songs (BMI) o/b/o Skylar Grey/Oakland 13 Music (ASCAP)
All rights administered by Wb Music Corp. o/b/o Itself and Oakland 13 Music
Beyoncé appears courtesy of Columbia Records, a division of Sony Music EntertainmentPersonnel'

Eminem – vocals, songwriter
Beyoncé – vocals, songwriter
Skylar Grey – songwriter, co-producer, piano
Rick Rubin – producer, turntables
Mike Strange – recording engineer
Joe Strange – recording engineer
Jason Lader – recording engineer, bass, drum programmer, moog, synthesizer, string arranger
Stuart White – recording engineer
Rob Bisel – assistant engineer, digital editor
Johnnie Burik – assistant engineer, digital editor
Tony Campana – assistant engineer
The Section Quartet – strings
Eric Gorfain – violin
Richard Dodd – cello
Daphne Chen – violin
Leah Katz – viola
Manny Marroquin – mixer
Brian "Big Bass" Gardner – mastering engineer

Charts

Certifications

Release history

References

External links 

2010s ballads
2017 singles
2017 songs
Beyoncé songs
Eminem songs
Shady Records singles
Aftermath Entertainment singles
Interscope Records singles
Songs written by Eminem
Songs written by Skylar Grey
Songs written by Beyoncé
Song recordings produced by Rick Rubin
Music videos directed by Rich Lee
Alternative hip hop songs